The Jing River or Jing He (Pinyin: Jīng Hé), also called Jing Shui, is a tributary of the Wei River, which in turn is the largest tributary of the Yellow River.

The river's flow varies greatly throughout the year, and soil erosion causes serious problems in its basin. Summer floods cause the Jing to be laden with sediment; in the dry season, the river flows with relatively clear water.

The river flows through important farming areas, and its basin is inhabited by 9.5 million people.

Water in the Jing River comes from Mount Liupan in Ningxia Hui Autonomous Region and flows through Gansu and Shaanxi, where it joins the Wei River in Gaoling District of Xi'an. Other than its upper reaches, the river flows through loess landscape throughout its length.

According to Chinese mythology a Dragon King ruled over the river. The Jing River basin is one of birthplaces of ancient Chinese civilization such as the Zhou dynasty.

See also
List of rivers in China

References 

Rivers of Gansu
Tributaries of the Yellow River
Rivers of Shaanxi

Rivers of Ningxia